Hubert Parker was an Australian politician.

Hubert Parker may also refer to:

Hubert Parker, Baron Parker of Waddington, British judge
Hubert "Buster" Parker, brother of Bonnie Parker of Bonnie and Clyde

See also
Bert Parker (disambiguation)